The Death of Frank Sinatra is a 1996 novel by Michael Ventura.

Plot
Mike Rose is a Las Vegas private eye.  His schizophrenic brother Alvi is released from the mental hospital and mouths off to Zig, a gangster who long ago killed Rose's father and slept with his mother. Plus a devilish client wants Rose to murder her husband.

References

1996 novels
English-language novels
American detective novels
Hardboiled crime novels